Bathybembix abyssorum is a species of sea snail, a marine gastropod mollusk in the family Eucyclidae.

Distribution
This species occurs in the Indo-Pacific.

References

External links
 To Biodiversity Heritage Library (2 publications)
 To Encyclopedia of Life
 To World Register of Marine Species

abyssorum
Gastropods described in 1891